Locksley Wellington Hampton (April 21, 1932 – November 18, 2021) was an American jazz trombonist, composer and arranger. As his nickname implies, Hampton's main instrument was slide trombone, but he also occasionally played tuba and flugelhorn.

Biography

Early life and career
Locksley Wellington Hampton was born on April 21, 1932, in Jeannette, Pennsylvania. Laura and Clarke "Deacon" Hampton raised 12 children, taught them how to play musical instruments and set out with them as a family band. The family first came to Indianapolis in 1938. The Hamptons were a very musical family in which mother, father, eight brothers, and four sisters, all played instruments. His sisters included Dawn Hampton and Virtue Hampton Whitted. Slide Hampton is one of the few left-handed trombone players. As a child, Hampton was given the trombone set up to play left-handed, or backwards; and as no one ever dissuaded him, he continued to play this way.

At the age of 12, Slide played in his family's Indianapolis jazz band, The Duke Hampton Band.  By 1952, at the age of 20, he was performing at Carnegie Hall with the Lionel Hampton Band. He played with the Buddy Johnson's R&B band from 1955 to 1956, then became a member of Maynard Ferguson's band (1957–1959), where he played and arranged, providing excitement on such popular tunes as "The Fugue," "Three Little Foxes" and "Slide's Derangement." While with the Ferguson band he composed and arranged memorable charts such as "Frame For the Blues," "Go East Young Man," "Newport," Sometimes I Feel Lika A Motherless Child," "Ole" and "'Round Midnight."    In 1958, he recorded with trombone masters on the classic release of Melba Liston, Melba Liston and Her 'Bones. As his reputation grew, he soon began working with bands led by Art Blakey, Tadd Dameron, Barry Harris, Thad Jones, Mel Lewis, and Max Roach, contributing both original compositions and arrangements. In 1962, he formed the Slide Hampton Octet, with horn players Freddie Hubbard, and George Coleman. The band toured the U.S. and Europe and recorded on several labels.

From 1968
In 1968, he toured with Woody Herman's orchestra, settling in Europe where he remained until 1977. He taught at Harvard, artist-in-residence in 1981, the University of Massachusetts, De Paul University in Chicago, and Indiana State University. During this period he led World of Trombones, his own nine-trombone, three-rhythm band; co-led Continuum, a quintet with Jimmy Heath that plays the music of Tadd Dameron; and freelanced as a writer and a player. In 1986 Hampton appeared in "Play It Again, Russell," an episode of The Cosby Show. He also played the trombone in Diana Ross Live! The Lady Sings... Jazz & Blues: Stolen Moments (1992), DVD.

On June 4, 2006, Hampton and long time manager and writing partner Anthony-charles:Bey promoted his first self funded concert at The Tribeca PAC in New York City (a tribute to Antonio Carlos Jobim) and debuted the Slide Hampton™ Ultra-Big Band.  The concert was the first of many planned for the near future.

In 2009, Hampton completed four new compositions collectively titled "A Tribute to African-American Greatness". The songs honored Nelson Mandela, Oprah Winfrey, Tiger Woods, Venus Williams, Serena Williams and Barack Obama. The songs contained accompanying lyrics written by Hampton and manager/writing partner Anthony-charles:Bey, arrangements honoring Thelonious Monk, Thad Jones, Eddie Harris, Dexter Gordon and Gil Evans round out the program. He completed two new Big Band arrangements – "In Case of Emergency" and "The Drum Song" (both Hampton originals).  These two songs (and others) will be available exclusively to universities and other educational institutions through Slide Hampton™ Musique/Music Publishing-in-trust.

Hampton was a resident of Orange, New Jersey. He died on November 18, 2021, at the age of 89.

Awards and honors
In 1998, he won a Grammy Award for "Best Jazz Arrangement Accompanying Vocalist(s)", as arranger for "Cotton Tail" performed by Dee Dee Bridgewater. He was also a Grammy winner in 2005 for "Best Large Jazz Ensemble Album," The Way: Music of Slide Hampton, The Vanguard Jazz Orchestra (Planet Arts), and received another nomination in 2006 for his arrangement of "Stardust" for the Dizzy Gillespie All-Star Big Band.

In 2005 Hampton was honored at the jazz festival in Indianapolis. There the Indianapolis Jazz Foundation inducted him into their Hall of Fame.

In 2005, the National Endowment for the Arts honored Slide Hampton with its highest honor in jazz, the NEA Jazz Masters Award.

Discography

As leader

As arranger
With Junior Cook
Good Cookin' (Muse, 1979) - also composer and performer
With Maynard Ferguson
 A Message from Newport (Roulette, 1958) – also composer and performer
 Swingin' My Way Through College (Roulette, 1959) – also performer
 Maynard Ferguson Plays Jazz for Dancing (Roulette, 1959) – also performer
 Newport Suite (Roulette, 1960) – also composer
 Let's Face the Music and Dance (Roulette, 1960) – also performer
 Maynard '61 (Roulette, 1961) – also composer and performer
 Maynard '62 (Roulette, 1962) – also composer and performer
 Maynard '64 (Roulette 1959-62 [1963]) – also performer [1 track]
With Dexter Gordon
 Sophisticated Giant (Columbia, 1977) – also composer and performer
With J. J. Johnson
 Goodies (RCA Victor, 1965)
With Melba Liston
Melba Liston and Her 'Bones (MetroJazz, 1958) - also performer

As sideman
With Nat Adderley
 Much Brass (Riverside, 1959)
With Art Blakey
 Killer Joe (Union Jazz, 1981) – with George Kawaguchi
With Robin Eubanks
 Different Perspectives (JMT, 1989)
With Maynard Ferguson
 Ridin' High (Enterprise, 1967)
With Art Farmer
The Meaning of Art (Arabesque, 1995) as arranger and performer
With Curtis Fuller
 Two Bones (Blue Note, 1958 [1980])
With Dizzy Gillespie
 Live at the Royal Festival Hall (Enja, 1989)
With Bill Hardman
Home (Muse, 1978)
Focus (Muse, 1980 [1984])
With Barry Harris
 Luminescence! (Prestige, 1967)
With Louis Hayes
The Real Thing (Muse, 1977)
With Philly Joe Jones 
Advance! (Galaxy, 1978) as arranger and performer
Drum Song (Galaxy, 1978 [1985]) as arranger and performer
With Sam Jones
 Changes & Things (Xanadu, 1977)
 Something in Common (Muse, 1977)
With Hank Mobley
 The Flip (Blue Note, 1970)
With Charles Mingus
 Mingus Revisited (1960)
With Oliver Nelson
 Berlin Dialogue for Orchestra (Flying Dutchman, 1970)
With Claudio Roditi
Claudio! (Uptown, 1985)
With Rob Schneiderman
 New Outlook (Reservoir, 1988)
With Woody Shaw
 The Woody Shaw Concert Ensemble at the Berliner Jazztage (Muse, 1976)
With McCoy Tyner
 13th House (Milestone, 1981)
 Turning Point (Birdology, 1992)
 Journey (Birdology, 1993)
With Randy Weston
 Destry Rides Again (United Artists, 1959)
 Uhuru Afrika (Roulette, 1960)

References

External links
 Slide Hampton discography at JazzDiscography.com
 
 Slide Hampton at The Trombone Page of the World
 

1932 births
2021 deaths
People from Jeannette, Pennsylvania
21st-century American male musicians
21st-century trombonists
American jazz trombonists
Atlantic Records artists
Criss Cross Jazz artists
Grammy Award winners
Jazz musicians from Pennsylvania
American male jazz musicians
Male trombonists
Telarc Records artists
Verve Records artists
21st-century African-American musicians
20th-century African-American people